Mandinga is a Romanian pop group band from Bucharest. The original soloist of the band was Elena Gheorghe who left in 2005. From 2006 until 2016, the lead vocalist was Elena Ionescu. Ionescu left the band in March 2016 to pursue a solo career and was replaced by Spanish singer Barbara Isasi.

After winning the Romanian national final, the group represented Romania in the Eurovision Song Contest 2012 and placed 12th with the song "Zaleilah".

Discography

Albums 
...de corazón (2003)
Soarele Meu (2005)
Gozalo (2006)
Donde (2008)
Club de Mandinga (2012)

Singles 
International singles

References 

Romanian pop music groups
Eurovision Song Contest entrants of 2012
Eurovision Song Contest entrants for Romania
Musical groups established in 2002